The Taking Chances World Tour is the ninth concert tour by Canadian singer Celine Dion, in support of her thirteenth French-language and twenty-second studio album D'elles (2007). tenth English-language and twenty-third studio album Taking Chances (2007). The tour marked the return of Dion after performing her groundbreaking show A New Day... in Las Vegas for five years. It also marks as her first concert tour in 9 years since her 1998–1999 Let's Talk About Love World Tour. The tour visited Africa, Asia, Australia, Europe and North America. Pollstar announced its total gross at US$279.2 million, making it the fourth highest-grossing tour by a solo artist at that time and one of the highest-grossing tours of all time.

Background and development

The show, directed by Jamie King (famously known for his work with Madonna), combined Dion's performances with color, fashion and dance. Dion performed some of her biggest hits, along with songs from her latest English album Taking Chances. The two-hour show was divided into four segments: soul, rock, Middle-Eastern and, fashion-victim. Dion was supported by eight dancers (4 male and 4 female). Rehearsals took place in December 2007 in Primm, Nevada and MGM Grand Garden Arena.

The tour setup included about twenty LED screens, among them one that orbited above the stage, plus conveyor belts and elevators. Dion pre-recorded a selection of videos for her show. The introduction video showed her driving a car at high-speed, set to a remix of "I Drove All Night" as the beginning of her concert. There have been 2 versions of the introduction video: The first version showed footage of Dion's career, and was seen in all South Africa, Asia, Australia, and some European dates before the second version, which was footage from cities Dion visited during the tour. As the tour went on, the intro video shaped up and more cities ended up being added. Another video showed the singer dressed in varying fashions over the years, with the "My Heart Will Go On" remix in the background.

Jamie King joined the tour on 2 May 2008 in Manchester, England. Before that date, the show was not on a central stage (except in Japan) for logistics reasons. After two and a half months, Dion rehearsed again to perfect the show for the "in the round" setup. Because of Dion's bilingual career and the restrictions of certain arenas and stadiums on the tour, King had to direct and choreograph three separate shows. One show featured a set-list mostly of English-language songs, and was performed in-the-round using the full system of mobile screens, elevators, and conveyor belts.  A second show also featured the center stage arrangement, but included about ten French language songs for performances in Francophone countries.  A third, less complex show was used where the center stage arrangement would not fit into the venue or where it would be impractical to transport the stage. An end stage setup was used in these cases, and featured a massive central video screen and a lighting system that engulfed the stage in brilliant blue and red from above on all three sides. Before the European leg, the central and end stage setups were redone, changing lights and cues, in order for the three separate shows to fit in these two stages. Dion premiered new costumes when the European tour began.

Dion and her band rehearsed about 60 tracks, both in English and French.  Among those, about 27 songs were performed in each show, according to each visited market. "Pour que tu m'aimes encore" was performed throughout the whole tour. It is the best-selling French-language single of all time, and one of the only French songs in music history to achieve chart success in many non-Francophone countries. The singer also performed several cover songs, including: James Brown's "I Got the Feelin'" and "It's a Man's Man's Man's World", and Queen's "We Will Rock You" and "The Show Must Go On" (although the last two were dropped starting with 27 October Winnipeg show). She also performed Kiki Dee's "I've Got the Music in Me" but the song was removed after concerts in South Korea.

Although not officially a part of the Taking Chances Tour, Dion performed in front of 250,000 spectators at the Quebec City 400th Anniversary Concert. The concert was held at the Plains of Abraham on 22 August 2008. The concert was part of a year-long festivities to celebrate the founding of Quebec City. It was noted for being the largest crowd Dion has performed for in her entire recording history. The show, exclusively performed in French, featured many special guests, including: Garou, Dan Bigras, Ginette Reno and Jean-Pierre Ferland. The show aired live on Bell Satellite TV and was watched by over 200,000 people.

Broadcasts and recordings
 

On 22 August 2008, the City of Lévis aired Dion's honorary Quebec City's 400th birthday concert on both the web and television. Dion performed in front of 250,000 people. Additionally on 31 August 2008, a special performance of "My Love", aired on the Jerry Lewis MDA Telethon. It became later the official video for the single "My Love."

Official tour photo book, called Celine autour du monde was released on 24 September 2009 in Québec and France and It includes 368 pages with 485 photos by Gérard Schachmes. There are images from concerts and backstage, photos of Dion, her family, tour team, dancers, singers, musicians and technicians, Dion intimate moments with her husband, René Angélil, and their son, Rene-Charles. There are all kind of photographs from walking on the River Thames, in a park with lions, a safari in Africa, to travel in private aircraft, including the arrival of trucks in the early morning in New York City and the spectacular assembling the scene. The book was released in Canada on 14 October 2009. The U.S. and Japanese editions are also planned.

The tour was chronicled in the documentary, Celine: Through the Eyes of the World, which gave the "unique opportunity to follow Celine everywhere, on stage, backstage, enjoying free time with her family; this movie will show it all." It was released on DVD and Blu-ray on 11 May 2010.

Taking Chances World Tour: The Concert was released on 11 May 2010. It contains a DVD and a live CD of the English and French setlists (each released separately). The English set list was recorded in Boston (on 12 and 13 August 2008), while the French one in Montreal (on 31 August and 1 September 2008). There is also a deluxe edition including both DVDs and a 52-page booklet and fold-out souvenir postcards.

Commercial reception

Dion set a record in the history of Canadian concerts, when she sold out all her Montreal shows in only a few minutes. After further shows being added, bringing the total to 11, Montreal's audience (with 20,995 in attendance at each show) became the largest on the tour with 227,616 spectators for a single city. Dion performed in Bell Centre 31 times since 1996.
Other Canadian concerts were sold out immediately, prompting second dates to be added in Edmonton, Vancouver and Winnipeg, and a third show added in Toronto. In the United States, second dates were announced in New York City, Uniondale, Boston, and Newark. In Ireland 64,000 tickets for her Dublin concert, the largest single concert of the scheduled tour, were sold out in 3 hours.

Dion also sold out stadium audiences in South Africa, Netherlands (50,000) and Denmark (42,000). A second concert date was added for Sydney, Australia after tickets were selling fast in this country. On 22 August 2008 although a free concert (not a part of the Taking Chances Tour), Dion sang in front of her biggest crowd at a live concert, when she performed on the Plains of Abraham to help celebrate Quebec City's 400th Birthday. Tickets were distributed to 250,000 people.

Dion announced she would be playing at The Colosseum at Caesars Windsor on 7 February 2008. Tickets sold out in a record 15 minutes with more than 125 people queuing the night before for tickets. The performance at the Kansas City's Sprint Center became the highest-grossing concert in the arena's history with a gross of $1,661,827. The record has since been broken By Elton John and Billy Joel. Dion's concert at the American Airlines Arena, set an attendance record, selling 17,725 tickets. Britney Spears broke that record two months later, performing for 18,644 people. However, although singing for a smaller audience, Dion grossed $2,247,233, while Spears managed to gross $1,972,928 only. According to her official website, Dion became the top-selling performer for three venues: Montreal's Bell Centre, Kansas City's Sprint Center, and the New Orleans Arena. The latter concert grossed $1,829,331. Dion's performances at the Bell Centre (in 2008) ranked second in Billboards Top 25 Boxscores.

Critical reception
The concerts received mixed reviews in the press. Diane Coetzer of Billboard claimed Dion's first performance in South Africa "may not have ultimately succeeded in presenting her as a multi-faceted performer, but it definitely confirmed that Dion is a singer of unparalleled ability. Performing in a stadium that ordinarily holds rugby fans and flanked by two huge screens, Dion used her astonishing voice to captivate the near-capacity crowd."  Coetzer praised the dancing and visuals, but believed the choice in covering soul songs and songs from Queen made the show awkward until the closing in which "My Heart Will Go On" was performed.

Jon Caramanica of the New York Times wrote that Dion "showed off a few new tricks without violating her core tenets of scale and pomp."  On the other hand, he described some of the other songs, such as "My Love" as "a technical exercise, a singer practicing her vocal workout in front of thousands of people."  The Independent gave a negative review of Dion's performance in the London concert, by awarding the show 2 stars out of 5 and claiming, "Many singers perform in their second language and manage to sound convincing. Despite selling a reported 200 million albums – including 27 million copies of that Titanic soundtrack – Céline Dion is not one of them."

Randy Lewis's article in the Los Angeles Times was more enthusiastic, opening with, "It's a no-brainer why Celine Dion's Taking Chances tour is shaping up as one of the highest-grossing North American concert attractions of 2008... hundreds of thousands of fans are filling arena after arena to hear Dion deliver emotional climax after emotional climax, goosebump-inducing vocal thrill after thrill, sweeping chorus after chorus filled with spirit-lifting affirmations and enough technical razzle-dazzle to dwarf the Super Bowl halftime show. And that was just her opening number."  The article was expanded, claiming "her vocal workouts are all about perfection — and without a hint Auto-Tuning in sight — she succeeds at letting her human side come through in the spaces between songs.  That gave some tangible ballast to the often overblown arrangements that typify her middle-of-the-road pop songs. The album from which the tour draws its name does indeed take a few chances —stylistically, placing her in harder-hitting rock settings than she, or her fans, have been used to. And she included a healthy dose of the new songs, pumped up by her razor-sharp band and three singers, who were joined by eight dancers on several of the night's biggest numbers."  Like in the previously mentioned Billboard article, the soul covers were not appreciated.

Sarah Rodman of the Boston Globe wrote positively, "There was never a dearth of stimulation, be it her own costume changes, the intricate lighting, the video imagery, or her cadre of dancers, deployed judiciously.  It's a testament to her skill however, that even when the songs weren't strong, Dion was."

CTV News acclaimed Dion's performance in Montreal, "Dion's stock moves were also on ready display – the fist jabs in the air, the sweep of the arms which makes her look as though she's going to take flight, and the cantering across the stage.  However, the trademark chest-thumping move dubbed 'the defibrillator' by comedians and critics wasn't as prominent.  The 'Taking Chances World Tour' marks Dion's return to the road after a five-year gig in Las Vegas and Celineophiles were tingling with excitement as they lined up to get into the Bell Centre.  Dion had the crowd in the palm of her hand to the point that when she swaggered over to a corner of the stage during various songs, the crowd in that section rose as one as though on command and reached out."

Much of the critical division came towards Dion's new image as someone who came back from a Vegas showcase.  Dave Simpson of The Guardian gave the Manchester concert 3 stars out of 5 and stated, "in her nine-year break from touring (apart from a residency in Vegas), Dion has clearly been abducted by aliens and replaced by CelineBarbie, a dancing sex goddess who makes raunchy smiles at the camera, dances with musclemen, performs rockers penned by Pink's songwriter Linda Perry and, bizarrely, turns Roy Orbison songs into gay disco."  An article in Sun Media gave the Toronto concert 3.5 out of 5 stars and stated, "Is Celine Dion really taking chances anymore?  Well, the name of her current world tour would say that she is, but the 40-year-old mega-selling pop star is basically Vegas personified."  On the other hand, The Vancouver Sun after praising the show's set-up, stated, "The idea here is presumably to humanize the diva, as it were, and, fittingly, during the show Dion makes use of two protruding catwalks to "mingle" with the audience. It's worth questioning how humanizing an influence doting devotees who can justify spending $520 for two hours of light entertainment really are, but that's a whole other thesis."

  Opening act  

Jody Williams 
Yuna Ito 
Anthony Callea 
Michaël Gregorio 
Arno Carstens 
Il Divo 
Jon Mesek 
The Story's 
Nordstrøm 
Calaisa 
Lenka Filipová 
Natalia Lesz 
Gordie Brown 
Véronic DiCaire 

Set listAFRICAASIA / AUSTRALIAEUROPE 

  

  NORTH AMERICA  
  

  

  

  
  

 Additional notesTaking Chances World Tour was organized to promote both "D'elles" and "Taking Chances" which were released in 2007.   
"D'elles" was only represented by "Et s'il n'en restait qu'une (je serais celle-là)" in French territories. "Immensité" was considered to be included but was never performed. Thus, only 1 out of 13 new songs was performed during the whole tour.
As far as "Taking Chances" is concerned,  10 out of 18 new songs were performed. "Taking Chances", "Eyes on Me", were included in every concert.  "Shadow of Love", "Alone", and "Fade Away" were occasionally cut while "My Love" took its permanent place since Seoul. "Can’t Fight the Feelin’" and "That's Just the Woman in Me" were performed in the first months of the tour during selected concerts (Africa, Asia, Australia). "A World to Believe In" was performed as a duet with Yuna Ito only in Japan. Finally, "A Song For You" was exclusively sung in Stockholm.
 Songs such as "Immensité", "Je ne vous oublie pas", "J’ai la musique en moi", "Je lui dirai" were included in the official tourbook which means they had been rehearsed but never performed during the tour. However, some tracks were performed even though they were not listed in the tourbook: "A World to Believe In,""A New Day Has Come," "A Song For You", and "The Prayer".
 During the first 3 concerts "I Drove All Night" was only included in the video intro as an interlude, followed directly by "I've Got the Music in Me". It was added during the 4th concert and remained the opening song sung by Celine throughout the tour.
"I've Got the Music in Me" was performed on selected dates in Africa and Asia.
"Tout l'or des hommes" was performed only during the first concert in Antwerp (13 May 2008) which means that, in general, "1 fille & 4 types" was not represented by any song throughout the whole tour. "On ne change pas" was also cut after the first French-speaking concert.
"Un garçon pas comme les autres (Ziggy)" was performed in French-speaking countries in Europe. In Canada it was replaced by "L’amour existe encore".
 Initially, during the Queen medley "We Will Rock You" was performed by the band as Celine had a costume change, then followed by "The Show Must Go On" sung by Dion. In Durban, both songs were sung by Celine and were performed that way until being cut for good in Winnipeg, Manitoba, Canada.
 Soul medley was mostly performed by backup singers with Dion joining them during "I Got the Feelin'"Extras'''
 Japan – Improvisation of Watashi Watashi Wa 
 Germany –  Improvisation of "Was Bedeute Ich Dir?" 
 Kraków 28 June 2008 – Improvisation of  "We Are Family" 
 Minneapolis 18 December 2008 – Improvisation of  "Purple Rain"
 Nashville 11 January 2009 – Improvisation of  "Nashville Tn Song"
 Miami 23 January 2009 – Improvisation of  "Conga"
 Omaha 26 February 2009 – Improvisation of  "AY-OH-MA-MA-HA"

Tour dates

Festivals and other miscellaneous performances
This concert benefited Nelson Mandela Children's Fund
This concert was a part of the "Main Square Festival"
These concerts were a part of the "Monte-Carlo Sporting Summer Festival"

Cancelled shows

Dion's performances at the Bell Centre (in 2008) ranked second in Billboard'''s Top 25 Boxscores.

Personnel
 Manager: René Angélil
 Tour director: Denis Savage
 Tour manager: Michel Dion (talent)
 Tour manager: Patrick Angélil (production, logistics and media relations)
 Production manager: Rick Mooney
 Assistant production manager: Shari Weber
 Stage manager: Alexandre Miasnikof
 Artist's personal security: Nick Skokos
 Tour rigger: Cindy Beaumariage
 Lighting director: Yves "Lapin" Aucoin
 Front of house engineer: François "Frankie" Desjardins
 Monitor engineer: Charles Ethier
 Audio system engineer: Mario St-Onge
 RF engineer: Marc Theriault
 Health Services/Chiropractor:  Trevelynn Henuset DC
 Assistant lighting director/lighting head: Karl Gaudreau
 Video director: Veillet Mireille
 Head back-line tech: Jeff Dubois
 Computer programmer and keyboard technician: Guy Vignola
 Head video: Martin Perreault
 Production assistants: Sharie Weber, Stephanie Duval
 Tour accountant: Sylvia Hebel
 Creative director: Jamie King
 Tour director: Jim Allison, Concerts West
 Production director: Lonnie McKenzie
 Lighting, audio, video vendor: Solotech, Montreal
 Merchandiser : Billy Wilson

Band
 Musical Director, Piano: Claude "Mégo" Lemay
 Drums: Dominique Messier
 Bass: Marc Langis
 Guitars: André Coutu
 Violin: Jean Sebastien Carré
 Keyboards: Yves Frulla
 Percussion: Nannette Fortier
 Cello: Julie McInnes
 Background vocals, Cello, Tin whistle: Élise Duguay
 Background vocals: Mary-Lou Gauthier, Barnev Valsaint, Andrew St. Pierre
 Dancers: Amanda Balen, Melissa Garcia, Kemba Shannon, Addie Yungmee, Zac Brazenas, Joshua Figueroa, Dominic Chaiduang, Aaron Foelske, Miguel Perez, Chris Houston, Tammy To

See also 
 List of highest-grossing concert tours

Notes

References 

Celine Dion concert tours
2008 concert tours
2009 concert tours